Aloys II (Aloys Maria Josef Johann Baptista Joachim Philipp Nerius; 25/26 May 1796 – 12 November 1858) was the sovereign Prince of Liechtenstein from 20 April 1836 until his death in 1858. He was a son of Johann I Joseph, Prince of Liechtenstein, and Landgravine Josepha of Fürstenberg-Weitra, and a nephew of Prince Aloys I. Aloys II married Countess Franziska Kinsky of Wchinitz and Tettau and had two sons and three daughters with her, with their two sons later ruling Liechtenstein as Johann II and Franz I. Aloys contributed actively to Liechtenstein's economic and political development.

Background

Prince Aloys was born in Vienna to Prince Johann I Joseph of Liechtenstein and Landgravine Josepha of Fürstenberg-Weitra. His father was at the time of his birth a colonel in the Austrian army, and since became a field marshal before becoming the ruling prince of Liechtenstein in 1805. Aloys at the same time became the heir apparent.

Marriage and issue

Aloys married Countess Franziska Kinsky of Wchinitz and Tettau (Vienna, 8 August 1813 – Vienna, 5 February 1881) on 8 August 1831 in Vienna. They had 11 children; nine daughters and two sons:
 Princess Marie Franziska de Paula Theresia Josepha (Vienna, 20 September 1834 – Vienna, 1 December 1909), married in Vienna on 29 October 1860 Count Ferdinand of Trauttmansdorff-Weinsberg (Vienna, 27 June 1825 – Schloss Fridau, 12 December 1896), and had issue
 Princess Carolina Maria Josepha Walpurgis Nestoria (Vienna, 27 February 1836 – Vienna, 28 March 1885), married in Vienna on 3 June 1855 Alexander Fürst von Schönburg-Hartenstein (Vienna, 5 March 1826 – Vienna, 1 October 1896), and had issue
 Princess Sophie Marie Gabriele Pia (Vienna, 11 July 1837 – Schloss Fischhorn, 25 September 1899), married in Vienna on 4 May 1863 as his second wife Charles, 6th Prince of Löwenstein-Wertheim-Rosenberg (Haid, 21 May 1834 – Köln, 8 November 1921), 1,067th Knight of the Order of the Golden Fleece in Austria, and had issue
 Princess Aloysia Maria Gabriela Hyppolita (Eisgrub, 13 August 1838 – Vienna, 17 April 1920), married in Vienna on 22 May 1864 Heinrich Graf von Fünfkirchen (Schloss Fünfkirchen, 25 January 1830 – Vienna, 2 January 1885), without issue
 Princess Ida Maria Lamberta Theresia Franziska de Paula (Eisgrub, 17 September 1839 – Libejic, 4 August 1921), married in Vienna on 4 June 1857 Adolf Joseph 8th Fürst zu Schwarzenberg (Vienna, 18 March 1832 – Libejic, 5 October 1914), 1,092nd Knight of the Order of the Golden Fleece in Austria, and had issue
 Johann II, Prince of Liechtenstein (1840–1929)
 Princess Franziska Xaveria Maria David (Vienna, 30 December 1841 – Vienna, 13 May 1858)
 Princess Henriette Maria Norberta (Schloss Liechtenstein bei Mödling, 6 June 1843 – Frauenthal Castle, 24 December 1931), married in Vienna on 26 April 1865 her first cousin Prince Alfred of Liechtenstein (1842–1907), and had issue, which eventually inherited the Principality by male line
 Princess Anna Maria Franziska de Paula Leandra (Vienna, 26 February 1846 – Prague, 22 April 1924), married in Vienna on 22 May 1864 Georg Christian, Prince of Lobkowicz (Vienna, 14 March 1835 – Prague, 22 December 1908), 1,145th Knight of the Order of the Golden Fleece in Austria, and had issue
 Princess Therese Maria Josepha Martha (Schloss Liechtenstein, 28 July 1850 – Munich, 13 March 1938), married in Vienna on 12 April 1882 Prince Arnulf of Bavaria (Munich, 6 July 1852 – Venice, 12 November 1907), 1,035th Knight of the Order of the Golden Fleece in Austria, and had issue, now extinct
 Franz I, Prince of Liechtenstein (1853–1938)

References

External links 
 Princely House of Liechtenstein

1796 births
1858 deaths
Princes of Liechtenstein
19th-century Liechtenstein people
Knights of the Golden Fleece of Austria